For God and Country is the fortieth solo studio album by American singer-songwriter Dolly Parton. It was released on November 11, 2003, by Welk Music Group and Blue Eye Records. The album was produced by Parton with Kent Wells and Tony Smith. It is considered Parton's musical attempt to deal with the aftermath of the September 11, 2001 attacks. Included are covers of famous patriotic songs and new Parton originals. The album is perhaps best remembered for its cover photo, depicting Parton posing as though appearing in a vintage USO poster.

Background
Parton appeared on the June 3, 2003 episode of MWL Star to premiere the music video for "I'm Gone" from here 2002 album, Halos & Horns. In addition to premiering the music video, she announced that she planned to release a new album in the fall titled For God and Country, containing inspirational and patriotic songs. She performed one song from the album, "I'm Gonna Miss You", and "9 to 5". On June 18, Parton made an appearance at a preview of her Dixie Stampede's new Orlando location, where she performed "Color Me America," which was used as the show's finale. She said she planned to include the song on her next album and that it should be released by September 11. On July 3, Parton appeared on Good Day Live where she announced that the album had been pushed back to early 2004. That evening she was interviewed on Larry King Live where she said that she planned to tour in 2004 to promote the album and that it will be a larger-scale event, describing it as her first big tour in several years. She also announced two more song titles from the album, "Peace in the Valley" and "Whispering Hope". The following night Parton headlined the 2003 A Capitol Fourth Independence Day concert. The special aired live from the West Lawn of the U.S. Capitol in Washington. She performed two songs from the upcoming album, "Light of a Clear Blue Morning" and "When Johnny Comes Marching Home", in addition to "9 to 5".

Release and promotion
The album was formally announced by Welk Music Group on August 26 with the album's release date, artwork, and track listing being revealed.

Parton appeared on the September 11 episode of The John Walsh Show where she performed two new songs that would be included on the album, "Color Me America" and "Brave Little Soldier".

On November 5, Parton appeared on The Early Show and performed "Color Me America" and "Welcome Home", which she announced would be the album's first single.

The album was released on November 11. Parton made an appearance on The Late Show with David Letterman the following evening, where she performed "Red, White and Bluegrass". On November 13, Parton appeared on Late Night with Conan O'Brien and performed "Light of a Clear Blue Morning" and "I Will Always Love You".

The music video for the album's first single, "Welcome Home", was shot over the January 10–11, 2004 weekend. It was premiered by CMT on February 4.

Parton made an appearance on Live with Regis and Kelly on May 7 where she performed "Light of a Clear Blue Morning" and announced that it would be the album's second single. She performed the song again on the May 20 episode of The Ellen DeGeneres Show, in addition to "9 to 5".

Critical reception

Brian Mansfield with USA Today gave a mixed review, saying that "Parton apparently saved up all the glitz she left off her recent bluegrass albums for this patriotic collection." He went on to say "the album comes off as her personal USO revue." He concluded by saying that "the album contains enough moving performances to erase any doubts about the sincerity of Parton's intent."

AllMusic's review of the album noted that "after recently recording countrified versions of songs like "Stairway to Heaven", Parton delivers these patriotic songs in a completely straightforward fashion. Other than the inherent twang of her pristine voice, there's little country flavor." The review went on to praise the original songs, saying, "The flag-wavers that fell from Parton's own pen, however, can't help but display the country legend's musical roots, and it's these that are the ultimate standouts."

Commercial performance
For God and Country peaked at number 23 on the Billboard Top Country Albums chart and number 167 on the Billboard 200. It also peaked at number 6 on the Billboard Independent Albums chart.

The album has sold 87,000 copies in the United States as of October 2005.

Track listing

Personnel
Adapted from the album liner notes.

Chick Ainley – recording, digital editing, mixing
Monty Allen – background vocals
Charlie Anderson – bass guitar
Bob Bailey – background vocals
Don Bailey – design, photo montages
Robert Behar – wardrobe
Jesse Benfield – digital editing, mixing assistant
Dennis Carney – photography
Dallas Christian Sound – additional vocals 
Gary "Biscuit" Davis – banjo
Michael Davis – piano, Hammond B-3, synth, programming location recording, digital editing
Hannah Dennison – "Brave Little Soldier" singers director
Richard Dennison – background vocals, vocal supervisor, production assistant
Kyle Dickenson – production assistant
The Fairfield Four – additional vocals 
Chris Ferrara – cover design
Aaron Flanary – location recording assistant
John Guess – mixing
Robert Hale – acoustic guitar, background vocals
Vicki Hampton – background vocals
The Harding University Concert Choir – additional vocals 
Erik Hellerman – digital editing
Steven Hill – background vocals
Paul Hollowell – piano, Hammond B-3
Teresa Hughes – production assistant
Russ Long – recording, digital editing
Luellyn Latocki – additional photos
Randy Kohrs – dobro
Jimmy Mattingly – fiddle, mandolin
Partrick Murphy – recording, digital editing, mixing assistant
Louis Nunley – background vocals
Jennifer O'Brien – background vocals
Judy Ogle – personal assistant
Dolly Parton – lead vocals, background vocals, producer
Benny Quinn – mastering
Cheryl Riddle – hair
Dace Sinco – recording
David Slater  – background vocals
Tony Smith – synth, programming, recording, digital editing, producer
Billy Thomas – drums, percussion
Jeff Thomas – digital editing
Sheryl Thomas – background vocals
Steve Turner – drums, percussion
Virginia Team – art direction, additional photos
James Waddell – digital editing
Bruce Watkins – acoustic guitar
Jay Weaver – bass guitar
Darrell Webb – mandolin, background vocals
Kent Wells – acoustic guitar, electric guitar, background vocals, producer
Lynn Wright – background vocals

Charts

References

2003 albums
Dolly Parton albums
Sugar Hill Records albums